Arnaldo Arevalo Ignacio (born March 17, 1964), known professionally as Arnell Ignacio, is a Filipino television personality, actor, singer-songwriter, and public official.

Ignacio has hosted several shows, like Chibugan Na!, Kwarta o Kahon, GoBingo, Katok Mga Misis, and K! The 1 Million Peso Videoke Challenge, and occasional hosts for ASAP and Wil Time Bigtime. He also guest judged for Kakaibang Idol, a special edition of Philippine Idol which was held for contestants with the most notable auditions.

In 2004, he declined offers to run for Quezon City councillor and vice mayor as the running mate of former Mayor Mel Mathay.

In 2016, he was appointed by President Rodrigo Duterte as Assistant Vice President for Community Relation and Services Department of the Philippine Amusement and Gaming Corporation (PAGCOR). He served in PAGCOR until January 2018 when he was transferred to the Overseas Workers Welfare Administration (OWWA) to serve as a deputy executive director and deputy administrator. He resigned from his post in February 2019 reportedly for personal reasons. In 2022, Ignacio was appointed by President Bongbong Marcos as the new administrator of the Overseas Workers Welfare Administration.

Ignacio is openly gay.

Filmography

Television

Film

Radio
 Si Susan Na, si Arnell Pa! (DZBB) (with Susan Enriquez)
 No More Lonely Nights with Arnell (DZIQ)
 PATOL: Republika ni Arnelli (Radyo5 92.3 News FM, with simulcast on AksyonTV)
 Manila sa Umaga! (Radyo5 92.3 News FM, with simulcast on AksyonTV)
 LOL: Labor of Love (DZMM) (with Rica Lazo)
 OMJ: Oh My Job! (DZBB) (with Tuesday Sagun-Niu and Bea Binene)

Awards
Winner, Best Game Show Host – PMPC Star Awards for Television (1997 & 2006)
Go Bingo (GMA Network)
Now Na! (QTV 11)
Winner, Best Talent Show Hosts – PMPC Star Awards for Television (2008)
Shall We Dance: The Celebrity Dance Challenge (with Lucy Torres-Gomez & Dominic Ochoa, ABC 5 "Now TV5")

Personal life
Ignacio had Frannie Ignacio, a businesswoman, as his live-in partner for 12 years before they got married on March 10, 2004. However, they got separated in the same year. As of 2015, he had plans to file an annulment. Together, they have an adult daughter named Sofia. He later got engaged to singer Ken El Psalmer in June 2015, but broke up almost two months later.

References

External links
 Arnel's Magnanimity

1964 births
Living people
20th-century Filipino male singers
ABS-CBN personalities
Bongbong Marcos administration personnel
Duterte administration personnel
Filipino LGBT actors
Filipino LGBT musicians
Filipino LGBT politicians
Filipino LGBT songwriters
Filipino game show hosts
Filipino male comedians
Filipino male film actors
Filipino male television actors
Filipino radio personalities
Filipino songwriters
GMA Network personalities
Notre Dame Educational Association alumni
TV5 (Philippine TV network) personalities